Arellius Fuscus (or Aurelius Fuscus) was an ancient Roman orator. He spoke with ease in both Latin and Greek, in an elegant and ornate style. Charles Thomas Cruttwell says that Arellius was an Asiatic, that is, a practitioner of an elevated oratorical style.

He was probably the teacher of Ovid (43 BC – 17/18 AD) and Pliny the Elder (23–79). He is mentioned in the Naturalis Historia of the latter. Another pupil was Papirius Fabianus.

Notes

1st-century BC Romans
1st-century Romans
Ancient Roman rhetoricians
Arellii
Aurelii